Kira Town, a municipality in the Wakiso District of the Central Region of Uganda, is the country's second-largest city by population. It is administered by the Kira Town Council, an urban local government.

Location
Kira town council was elevated to Municipal level by an Act of Parliament and became operational in financial year 2016/2017 under vote 781. Kira Municipality is bordered by Gayaza to the north, Mukono to the east, Lake Victoria to the south, Kampala to the west, and Kasangati to the north-west. The coordinates of the town are 0°23'50.0"N, 32°38'26.0"E (Latitude:0.397237; Longitude:32.640557).

Administration
Kira Municipality is made up of three Divisions of Namugongo, Kira and Bweyogere which are further divided into six administrative parishes. These are:

The political head of the Municipality is the His Worship the Mayor. Julius Mutebi Nsubuga and Technical head is Mr. Yiga Benon as the Municipal Town Clerk. Each division is politically led by the Chairperson and a Senior Assistant Town Clerk as the Technical head at that leavel   The supreme policy-making organ is the Municipal Council, composed of 17 elected councillors.

Population

Kira Municipality is the largest town (municipality) in Uganda by population. The town is the second-largest urban center in the country, after Kampala.

The population of Kira Town has grown at a relatively rapid rate compared to the national average over the last decade. Part of the rapid growth is attributable to the town's proximity to Kampala. Kira is a bedroom community for Kampala.

The national census in 2002 estimated Kira's population to be 140,774 people, of whom 67,222 (47.8 percent) were males and 73,548 (52.2 percent) were females. The Uganda Bureau of Statistics estimated the mid-year 2010 population to be 172,300 and the mid-year 2011 population to be 179,800. The town planner, however, estimated the population to be 300,000 in 2010. In August 2014, the national population census put the population at 317,157. In 2020, UBOS estimated the population of Kira Town to be 462,900 people. The population agency calculated that the population of the municipality grew at an average rate of 6.68 percent annually, between 2014 and 2020.

Economic activities
A large number of young adults are engaged in boda boda (motorcycle and bicycle) for-hire transportation. Increasingly, residents of Kira Town are employed in salaried and non-salaried positions in the city of Kampala and return to Kira in the evenings to sleep. The Kampala Industrial and Business Park, an  business development park developed by the Uganda Investment Authority at a cost of about US$180 million (about UGX:470.5 billion), is located at Namanve in Bweyogerere Ward in extreme southeastern Kira Town.

Sites of interest

Basilica of the Uganda Martyrs at Namugongo

The Catholic Basilica of the Uganda Martyrs has been built at Namugongo in Kyaliwajjala Ward, where the majority of the 22 Catholic Uganda Martyrs (now Saints) were burned alive on the orders of Ssekabaka Mwanga II in the late 19th century.

Kabaka's Palace at Kireka
Kabaka Ronald Muwenda Mutebi II and the Nnabagereka of Buganda, Sylvia Nagginda, maintain a palace on Kireka Hill, in Kireka Ward.

Mandela National Stadium

Mandela National Stadium is the largest stadium in Uganda, with a sitting capacity of 45,202 people. It is at Namboole, in Bweyogerere Ward.

Infrastructure

Kampala Northern Bypass Highway

The Kampala Northern Bypass Highway, also referred to as the Northern Bypass, is the first dual-carriage interstate highway to be built in Uganda. It forms an incomplete circle around the north-east, north, and north-west of the city of Kampala. The northern and eastern portion of the highway traverses Bweyogerere and Kireka wards, in Kira Town.

Umeme electricity substation
In 2015, the electricity distribution company Umeme built a 40 megaVolt-ampere substation in the Nsasa neighborhood of Kira Town, at a cost of US$7 million (UGX:24 billion). This substation is expected to stabilize the electricity grid and reduce power losses in this fast-growing urban area. Constructing the substation cost US$5 million, while US$2 million was spent on the erection of feeder lines.

Other public health issues
The Public Health Department of Kira Municipality is determined to improve the living conditions of its citizens, through detailed attention to sanitation, provision of safe drinking water, safe disposal of human and other waste, and the maintenance of hygiene in schools, markets, and other public places. Plans are underway to formulate minimum acceptable hygiene standards for private and public buildings and open spaces.

Poverty eradication
Efforts are underway to assist citizens in starting income-producing activities, including growing mushrooms.

Education
A number of first class primary and secondary schools are in the town.

In January 2011, the Shimoni Core Primary Teachers' College opened at Kitikifumba village in Kira Town. The college, formerly located on Nakasero Hill in Kampala, was established by the British government in 1952. In 2006, the former location was sold to an investor to construct the Kampala Intercontinental Hotel. The new location occupies . The facilities can accommodate approximately 450 students. The new college cost approximately UGX:8 billion to build.

In 2011, St. Augustine International University (SAIU), a private, multi-campus university, received a provisional license from the Uganda National Council for Higher Education. SAIU is one of a number of private universities accredited between 2010 and 2014. It maintains a campus at Namugongo, where it hosts its College of Agriculture and Veterinary Medicine.

Notable people
 Arthur Sserwanga - Professor, accountant, entrepreneur, and academic administrator, is a native son. Vice chancellor of Muteesa I Royal University.
 Hakim Sendagire - Professor, physician, microbiologist, biochemist, and academic administrator. Dean of Habib Medical School.

See also
 List of cities and towns in Uganda

Photos
 Photo of Mandela National Stadium
 Photo of Kampala Northern Bypass Highway

References

External links
About The Kampala Northern Bypass Highway
Ssemujju setting the pace in contest for new Kira municipality

 
Populated places in Central Region, Uganda
Cities in the Great Rift Valley
Populated places on Lake Victoria